This is a list of notable bean soups, characterized by soups that use beans as a primary ingredient.

Bean soups

 15 Bean Soup – a packaged dry bean soup mix produced by the N.K. Hurst Co. in the United States
 Amish preaching soup – in American cuisine, it was typically served preceding or following Amish church services. Some versions are prepared with beans and ham hocks.
 Bissara – a soup and a bean dip in African cuisine, prepared with dried, puréed broad beans as a primary ingredient.
 Black bean soup 
 Bob chorba – a national Bulgarian dish, the name translates to "bean soup". It is prepared using dried beans, onions, tomatoes, chubritza or dzhodzhen (spearmint) and carrots.
 Bouneschlupp – a traditional Luxemburgish green bean soup with potatoes, bacon, and onions
Dal, a term used for lentils, a dish of cooked lentils, and lentil soup on the Indian subcontinent
 Fasolada – a Greek, Levantine, and Cypriot soup of dry white beans, olive oil, and vegetables, sometimes called the "national food of the Greeks".
 Fazulnica - a Moravian popular soup made from smoked meat broth, lard, onion, garlic, marjoram, brown beans and peppers. Add cut smoked and boiled meat and beans.
 Frejon – a bean and coconut milk soup, it is consumed by some Christians on Good Friday in various areas of the world
 Ful medames is a fava beans stew served with vegetable oil, cumin, and optionally with chopped parsley, garlic, onion, lemon juice, and chili pepper. It is a staple food in Egypt and a common part of the cuisines of many Middle Eastern and African cultures.
 Hong dou tang – or red bean soup is a popular Chinese dish served in Mainland China, Hong Kong, and Taiwan. It is categorized as a tang shui (literally translated as sugar water), or sweet soup.
 Istrian stew
 Jókai bean soup – a Hungarian soup prepared using pinto beans
 Kwati – a mixed soup prepared using nine types of sprouted beans, it is a traditional Nepalese dish consumed on the festival of Gun Punhi, the full moon day of Gunlā which is the tenth month in the Nepal Era lunar calendar. 
 Pasulj – a bean soup made of usually white beans, cranberry beans or pinto beans, and more rarely kidney beans, that is common in Serbian, Montenegrin, Bosnian, Croatian and Slovenian cuisines. It is a common winter dish, and is typically prepared with meat, particularly smoked meat such as smoked bacon, sausage, and ham hock.
Pasta fagioli, an Italian soup of pasta and beans
Pea soup
 Senate bean soup – served in the dining room of the United States Senate every day, in a tradition that dates back to the early 20th century, it is prepared using navy beans, ham hocks, and onion.
 Stew peas – a Jamaican stew prepared using coconut milk, beans and salted meat, it is a common in Jamaica and elsewhere in the Caribbean.
 Zuppa toscana – containing cannellini beans

See also
 List of legume dishes
 List of soups
 Soup beans – a bean dish

Notes

References

Bean soups
Bean